Terra X: Schliemanns Erben is a German television series about history and archaeology. The original title of the documentary series was just Schliemanns Erben which translates to heirs of Schliemann, a reference to the German archaeologist Heinrich Schliemann. Later it was rebranded to Terra X, a brand used by ZDF for its documentaries.

See also 
 List of German television series

External links 
 

2000s German television series
1996 German television series debuts
2010 German television series endings
German documentary television series
German-language television shows
ZDF original programming